Senokos is a village in the municipality of Vrapčište, North Macedonia. It used to be part of Negotino-Pološko Municipality.

Demographics
As of the 2021 census, Senokos had 1,351 residents with the following ethnic composition:
Albanians 1,288
Persons for whom data are taken from administrative sources 62
Macedonians 1

According to the 2002 census, the village had a total of 1,634 inhabitants. Ethnic groups in the village include:
Albanians 1,602
Macedonians 2
Bosniaks 2
Others 28

References

External links

Villages in Vrapčište Municipality
Albanian communities in North Macedonia